The Habrocerinae are a subfamily of the Staphylinidae, rove beetles.

Anatomy 
The antennomeres of the Habrocerinae are extremely slender. Their bodies are in general compact and sublimuloid, and the tarsi, like many rove beetles, have 5-5-5 segments.  They are found in forest litter, wood debris, and fungi. Of the two known genera, one genus, Habrocerus with three species occurs in North America.

References

External links

Habrocerinae at Bugguide.net. 

Staphylinidae
Beetles of North America
Beetle subfamilies